The Äußerer Bärenbartkogel is a mountain in the Planeil group of the Ötztal Alps in South Tyrol, Italy.

References 
Walter Klier, Alpenvereinsführer Ötztaler Alpen, München 2006, 
Alpine Club Map 1:25.000, Sheet 30/2, Ötztaler Alpen, Weißkugel
Tobacco-Verlag, Udine, Carta topografica 1:25.000, Sheet 043, Alta Val Venosta / Vinschgauer Oberland

Mountains of the Alps
Mountains of South Tyrol
Alpine three-thousanders
Ötztal Alps